Ruellia glanduloso-punctata is a plant native to the Cerrado vegetation of Brazil.

glanduloso-punctata
Flora of Brazil